David Crooks may refer to:

David Crooks (RNZAF officer) (1931–2022), New Zealand air marshal
Dave Crooks (born 1963), American politician

See also
Dave Barker (David Crooks, born 1948), Jamaican reggae musician